Live in Cartoon Motion is Mika's first live DVD. It is a recording of the French leg of his tour, at L'Olympia Paris on 30 June 2007. The DVD also features a documentary, all Mika video clips to date and extra TV performances.

Track listing

Musicians
 Mika – vocals
 Mike Choi – bass, backing vocals
 Martin Waugh – guitar, backing vocals
 Luke Juby – keyboards, backing vocals
 Cherisse Osei – drums, backing vocals
 Lorna Bridge, Sandrinne Peyronnenc, Ali Richards – backing vocals

References

Mika (singer) video albums
Albums recorded at the Olympia (Paris)
2007 live albums
2007 video albums
Live video albums
Island Records live albums
Island Records video albums
Universal Records live albums
Universal Records video albums
Festival Records live albums
Festival Records video albums
Warner Records video albums
Warner Records live albums